Loo Wit is an outdoor 1975–1976 sculpture by James Rosati, currently installed at the Seattle University campus in Seattle, Washington.

Description

History
Loo Wit was purchased by Richard Hedreen, the developer of the Holiday Inn Crowne Plaza Hotel (113 6th Avenue); Hedreen installed the sculpture outside the hotel in 1980. The work was installed at Seattle University on August 31, 2015, after being gifted by Hedreen and his wife, Betty Petri Hedreen.

See also
 1976 in art

References

1976 sculptures
Abstract sculptures in Washington (state)
Aluminum sculptures in Washington (state)
Outdoor sculptures in Seattle
Seattle University campus